Fish Tales is a fishing-themed pinball game released by Williams in 1992.  It is one of the top 20 most produced pinball machines of all time, selling more than 13,000 units.

Overview
The general goal is to catch as many fish and tell the most outlandish stories about their size possible. The machine's backglass is topped with a plastic fish that thrashes its tail when the player achieves certain goals, and the players launches balls with an autoplunger shaped like a fishing rod.

Fish Tales introduced flippers with lightning bolts on them that were believed to be  shorter than other Williams flippers of the time.  While seemingly minor, an extra  gap creates a far greater ball control challenge for the player.  As such, this enhancement was only added to a few pinball titles before being abandoned.

Gameplay
The player is presented with three main objectives:

 Multiball – Shots to the Caster's Club "lock" (hold onto) balls.  Three locks starts multiball.
 Catching Fish – Two sets of side targets allow the player to catch fish.  When at least one fish is caught, the player has about 10 seconds to shoot a spinner to "Stretch The Truth" about its size, from 1× to 5× actual size (points for the catch multiplied accordingly), or a "total lie" which awards the player nothing for the fish. However, completing the "L-I-E" rollovers at the top does remove the lowest value from "Stretch The Truth" and advances the bonus multiplier.
 The Boat – The center of the board contains a captive ball area in the shape of a boat.  Successful hits to a lit captive ball give the player increasing awards, from Hold Bonus to Instant Multiball, and then increasing point awards leading to a "Special" (free game).

Other objectives include:

 Monster Fish: Shots to the lit criss-crossing center ramps light "Monster Fish" on the spinner, a "Hurry-Up" that can be worth 20 to 50 Million points. Some players regard this considerable easier than the jackpot combination.
 Feeding Frenzy: Four caught fish light the two ramps and two loops, for 5, 5, 5 and 20 Million if completed in a short time.
 Rock The Boat: A captive ball award, it gives the player 10 million for ramp shots for a short time.
 Video Mode: Another captive ball award, the player plays a video game on the dot-matrix display where he has to shoot down waterskiers for points and a possible extra ball. Hitting 15 boats gives 10 million extra, hitting all 20 boats awards 20 million bonus (totalling to about 42 million).  If the letters "EB" pop up on the screen, shooting the EB awards an extra ball.
 Fish Finder: A random award achieved by shooting the top scoop after passing the right inlane next to the slingshot (Multiball and Extra Ball are only awarded in non Tournament Mode).
 Extra Balls: They are found in three places: Rock the boat, Fish Finder random award and Video Mode.
 Jackpot/Super Jackpot: During multiball, shooting the Caster's Club lock then prompts the player to shoot the left spinner for the Jackpot.  Completing three levels (tropical fishing, fresh water fishing, deep sea fishing) then allows the player to win the super jackpot; this is done by shooting the captive ball in the center of the table.

Game quotes
 "Gone fishin', leave a message."
 "Oh yeah, that's a keeper."
 "Ay Pop, look! Water-skiers!"
 "WHOA, you're not gonna eat that, are ya?"
 "I'll tell ya, it was this big!"
 "OH, you got one on there EH?"
 "Are ya gonna talk or are ya gonna FISH!?"
 "What a beauty!"
 "Super jackpot"
 "Don't move."

Design Team
 Williams: 1992
 Model #: 50005
 Production: 13,640
 Art: Pat McMahon
 Design: Mark Ritchie
 Software: Mark Penacho
 Sound & Music: Chris Granner
 Concept: Python Anghelo, McMahon, Ritchie

Legacy
Fish Tales was available as downloadable content for The Pinball Arcade, until the license expired on June 30, 2018. It was added as a free table for Williams Pinball: Volume 1 for Pinball FX 3 on October 9, 2018.

At the Pinburgh 2001 tournament, Glenn Wilson achieved a score of 12,724,506,740.

References

External links
 
 Internet Pinball Database entry for Fish Tales
 Pinball Archive rule sheet
 Internet Pinball Serial Number Database entry
 Fish Tales promo video
 Tutorial Video

Williams pinball machines
1992 pinball machines